Khontakata Union is an Union parishad of Sarankhola Upazila, Bagerhat District in Khulna Division of Bangladesh. It has an area of 38.85 km2 (15.00 sq mi) and a population of 42,402.

References

Unions of Sarankhola Upazila
Unions of Bagerhat District
Unions of Khulna Division